Iskandar Dzhalilov ((), born 1 June 1992) is a Tajik former professional footballer who played as a defender. Dzhalilov also holds Russian citizenship, and is second cousins of fellow footballers Manuchekhr Dzhalilov and Alisher Dzhalilov.

Career
In September 2013, Dzhalilov moved on loan from FC Rubin Kazan to FC Istiklol, returning to Rubin in January 2014 after his loan deal with  expired.

He made his Russian National Football League debut for FC Volga Nizhny Novgorod on 6 July 2014 in a game against FC Sibir Novosibirsk. Dzhalilov relocated to Bulgaria in July 2016, signing a contract with newly promoted Bulgarian First League football club Dunav Ruse. He was released in June 2017.

On 5 July 2017, Dzhalilov signed with Russian side Baltika Kaliningrad for 1+1 years.

On 19 June 2018, Dzhalilov returned to Bulgaria, signing for two years with Lokomotiv Plovdiv. On 30 July 2018 Dzhalilov's contract with Lokomotiv Plovdiv was cancelled by mutual consent.

In March 2021, whilst on international duty with Tajikistan, Dzhalilov suffered a dislocated foot and fractured lower leg.

On 13 May 2022, Dzhalilov announced that due to persistent injuries he would be retiring from football following Istiklol's game against Khujand on 15 May 2022.

Career statistics

Club

International

Statistics accurate as of match played 29 March 2022

Honours

Club
Istiklol
 Tajik League (3): 2019, 2020, 2021
 Tajik Cup (1): 2019
Tajik Supercup (3): 2019, 2020, 2022

References

External links
 
 
 
 

1992 births
Living people
Tajikistani footballers
Tajikistan international footballers
Russian footballers
Russia youth international footballers
Russian people of Tajik descent
Russian people of Tajikistani descent
Tajikistani expatriate footballers
Expatriate footballers in Romania
Expatriate footballers in Bulgaria
CS Turnu Severin players
Liga I players
PFC CSKA Moscow players
FC Rubin Kazan players
FC Istiklol players
Tajikistan Higher League players
FC Volga Nizhny Novgorod players
FC Dunav Ruse players
First Professional Football League (Bulgaria) players
FC Baltika Kaliningrad players
PFC Lokomotiv Plovdiv players
FC Botev Vratsa players
Sportspeople from Dushanbe
Association football fullbacks
FC Neftekhimik Nizhnekamsk players